Rhapsody in Blue is a musical composition by American composer George Gershwin.

It may also refer to:

Rhapsody in Blue (film), a 1945 film about George Gershwin
Rhapsody in Blue (TV series), a 2006 Singaporean television show
"Rhapsody in Blue" (Farscape episode), an episode of the television series Farscape
"Rhapsody in Blue", a 2013 Judge John Hodgman podcast episode
Rhapsody in Blue (album), a 2013 album by pianist Uri Caine

See also 

 A Rhapsody in Black and Blue, a 1932 short film